is a Japanese football player. He plays for Fagiano Okayama.

Career
Hiroki Mawatari joined J2 League club Ehime FC in 2017.

Club statistics
Updated to 22 February 2018.

References

External links
Profile at Ehime FC

1994 births
Living people
National Institute of Fitness and Sports in Kanoya alumni
Association football people from Fukuoka Prefecture
Japanese footballers
J2 League players
Ehime FC players
Kawasaki Frontale players
Fagiano Okayama players
Association football goalkeepers